Joakim Garff (born 25 February 1960, London) is a Danish theologian and Søren Kierkegaard scholar at Søren Kierkegaard Research Center at the University of Copenhagen. He has written several books on Kierkegaard including Soren Kierkegaard: A Biography.

External links 
Joakim Garff

1960 births
Danish Protestant theologians
20th-century Danish biographers
21st-century Danish biographers
Male biographers
Kierkegaard scholars
Living people
Academic staff of the University of Copenhagen
20th-century Protestant theologians